The Infocomm Clubs Programme is a Co-Curricular Activity (CCA) for primary schools, secondary schools and junior college students in Singapore, set up in 2006 by the Infocomm Development Authority of Singapore.

See also
 Intelligent Nation 2015

References

External links
 Infocomm Talent Portal
 National Infocomm Awards

Schools in Singapore
Internet in Singapore